Atopophrynus is a genus of frogs. It is monotypic, being represented by a single species, Atopophrynus syntomopus, also known as the Sonson frog.  Its taxonomic placement within the superfamily Brachycephaloidea is uncertain, although many sources place it in the family Craugastoridae. It is endemic to Colombia and only known from its type series from Sonsón, in the Cordillera Central, Antioquia Department.

Description
The head is narrower than the body. The snout is short, oval in dorsal view and protruding in lateral view. Tympanum is absent. The canthus rostralis is rounded. Skin is smooth apart from a few scattered subconical tubercles dorsally. The fingers are basally webbed and, except the first one, bearing obvious rounded pads. The toes are almost fully webbed and bearing broad discs. Dorsal coloration is red with green markings overlain with white flecks, especially on the flanks. The lower parts are pale olive with blue-white spots edged with brown. The digital tips are yellow. The iris is bright copper.

All females were carrying large eggs in their ovaries; one of them had 12 eggs ) in diameter.

Habitat and conservation
Despite numerous surveys to the area of the type locality, no further specimens have been found. At present, the habitat at the type locality is completely degraded. It is unclear whether the species survives at or near the type locality.

References

Craugastoridae
Amphibians of the Andes
Amphibians of Colombia
Endemic fauna of Colombia
Amphibians described in 1982
Taxa named by John Douglas Lynch
Taxonomy articles created by Polbot